The Life of Andrew the Fool is a Byzantine hagiography text concerning Andrew of Constantinople. The text was very popular during the Byzantine era with thirty manuscripts dated between the tenth to the  sixteenth century AD, and in the post-Byzantine period, eighty-two Greek copies between the sixteenth to the nineteenth century.

Citations

Bibliography 

Christianity in the Byzantine Empire
10th-century Christian texts
Christian hagiography